Euphorbia lophogona is a species of plant in the family Euphorbiaceae. It is endemic to Madagascar. Its natural habitat is subtropical or tropical dry forests. It is threatened by habitat loss. It is popular as a houseplant due to its resiliency.

References

Endemic flora of Madagascar
lophogona
Vulnerable plants
Taxonomy articles created by Polbot